Sally P. Kerans (born May 26, 1960 in Danvers, Massachusetts) is an American politician who represents the 13th Essex District in the Massachusetts House of Representatives.  She previously held the post from 1991–1997.

On April 25, 2020, Sally Kerans announced that she would be running as a Democrat for the Massachusetts House of Representatives 13th Essex District seat, citing her experience in civic life and local government since leaving the Legislature. The Massachusetts Women’s Political Caucus endorsed her as a candidate in the 2020 Massachusetts general election.

See also
 2021–2022 Massachusetts legislature

References

1960 births
Democratic Party members of the Massachusetts House of Representatives
People from Danvers, Massachusetts
University of Massachusetts Amherst alumni
Living people
Women state legislators in Massachusetts
21st-century American women
Harvard Kennedy School alumni